Mathara was an Ancient city and suffragan bishopric in the Roman province of Numidia, in present Algeria.

Titular see 
In 1933, the bishopric was nominally revived as titular see, of the lowest (episcopal) rank, with a single exception, the present, archiepiscopal incumbent. 

It had following incumbents, mostly Latin:
 Laurenz Böggering (25 July 1967 – 10 January 1996)
 Alois Schwarz (27 December 1996 – 22 May 2001)
 David Motiuk (5 April 2002 – 25 January 2007)
 Franz-Josef Overbeck (18 July 2007 – 28 October 2009)
 Lisane-Christos Matheos Semahun (5 January 2010 – 19 January 2015), then auxiliary eparch of the Eastern Catholic (Alexandrian Rite) Metropolitan Ethiopian Catholic Archeparchy of Addis Abeba; next appointed suffragan of that Metropolitan in the newly created Ethiopian Catholic Eparchy of Bahir Dar–Dessie
 Titular Archbishop Ghaleb Moussa Abdalla Bader (23 May 2015—), Apostolic Nuncio to the Dominican Republic, Apostolic Delegate to Puerto Rico

References
 GigaCatholic, with titular incumbent biography links

Former Roman Catholic dioceses in Africa
Catholic titular sees in Africa